Cassandre, pseudonym of Adolphe Jean-Marie Mouron (24 January 190117 June 1968) was a French painter, commercial poster artist, and typeface designer.

Early life and career

He was born Adolphe Jean-Marie Mouron in Kharkiv, Ukraine, to French parents. As a young man, he moved to Paris, where he studied at the École des Beaux-Arts and at the Académie Julian. The popularity of posters as advertising afforded him an opportunity to work for a Parisian printing house. Inspired by cubism as well as surrealism, he earned a reputation with works such as Bûcheron (Woodcutter), a poster created for a cabinetmaker that won first prize at the 1925 Exposition Internationale des Arts Décoratifs et Industriels Modernes.

Cassandre became successful enough that with the help of partners he was able to set up his own advertising agency called Alliance Graphique, serving a wide variety of clients during the 1930s. He is perhaps best known for his posters advertising travel, for clients such as the Compagnie Internationale des Wagons-Lits. He was a pioneer on airbrush arts.

His creations for the Dubonnet wine company were among the first posters designed in a manner that allowed them to be seen by occupants in moving vehicles. His posters are memorable for their innovative graphic solutions and their frequent denotations to such painters as Max Ernst and Pablo Picasso. In addition, he taught graphic design at the École des Arts Décoratifs and then at the École d'Art Graphique.

With typography an important part of poster design, the company created several new typeface styles. Cassandre developed Bifur in 1929, the sans serif Acier Noir in 1935, and in 1937 an all-purpose font called Peignot. In 1936, his works were exhibited at the Museum of Modern Art in New York City which led to commissions from Harper's Bazaar to do cover designs.

Later career
With the onset of World War II, Cassandre served in the French army until the fall of France. His business long gone, he survived by creating stage sets and costumes for the theatre, something he had dabbled in during the 1930s. After the war, he continued this line of work while also returning to easel painting. He worked with several famous French fashion houses, designing playing cards and scarfs for Hermès and the well-known Yves Saint Laurent logo.

In his later years, Cassandre suffered from bouts of depression prior to his suicide in Paris in 1968.

In 1985, his son Henri Mouron published a study of his father's work in a book titled A.M. Cassandre.

Typeface
These foundry types were produced by Deberny & Peignot from designs by Cassandre:

Notable works 

 Nord Express, 1925
 Etoile Du Nord, 1927
 La Route Bleue, 1929
 Chemin De Fer Du Nord, 1929
 L’ Atlantique, 1931
 Triplex, 1930
 Dubonnet, 1932
 Normandie, 1935

References

Other sources
 Robert K. Brown, Susan Reinhold: The poster art of A. M. Cassandre. - New York: Dutton, 1979
 Henri Mouron: A. M. Cassandre : affiches, arts graph., théâtre. - München: Schirmer/Mosel, 1985published in English as Cassandre : Posters, Typography, Stage Designs - London: Thames and Hudson, 1986

External links
 Official french website with many samples of his work
 Art Directors Club biography, portrait and images of work

1901 births
1968 suicides
Artists from Kharkiv
People from Kharkovsky Uyezd
French graphic designers
French poster artists
Pseudonymous artists
20th-century French painters
Académie Julian alumni
Artists who committed suicide
Suicides in France